Red Rock is an unincorporated community in Bastrop County, Texas, United States.

School
Red Rock is served by the Bastrop Independent School District. The only Public School in the Red Rock area is Red Rock Elementary School.

Students in the Red Rock area attend Red Rock Elementary School, Cedar Creek Intermediate School, Cedar Creek Middle school, and Cedar Creek High School.

Climate
Climate is characterized by relatively high temperatures and evenly distributed precipitation throughout the year.  The Köppen Climate Classification subtype for this climate is "Cfa" (Humid Subtropical Climate).

References

Unincorporated communities in Bastrop County, Texas
Unincorporated communities in Texas